Isaac O'Maolfoghmhair (d 1235) was the first recorded Archdeacon of Killala.

References 

1235 deaths
13th-century Irish Roman Catholic priests
Archdeacons of Killala